The Communauté de communes La Brie Centrale is a former federation of municipalities (communauté de communes) in the Seine-et-Marne département and in the Île-de-France région of France. It was created in December 2004. It was dissolved in January 2017.

Composition 
The Communauté de communes comprised the following communes:

Andrezel
Argentières
Beauvoir
Champdeuil
Champeaux
Fouju
Verneuil-l'Étang
Yèbles

See also
Communes of the Seine-et-Marne department

References 

Former commune communities of Seine-et-Marne